WLWF (96.5 FM), branded "96.5 The Wolf", is a radio station broadcasting a country music format. Licensed to Marseilles, Illinois, United States, the station serves the LaSalle-Peru market in the heart of Starved Rock Country.  The station is owned by Starved Rock Media, Inc and plays today's country hits and Starved Rock Country Classics and features 20 in a row "Wolf Runs" throughout the day.  Rise & Grind with Jaimie (London) & Chris (Yucus) tarts the day. Brad Spelich hosts middays and Clare Bennett afternoons.  Taste of Country Nights is featured weeknights.  Each weekend you'll hear B-dub Radio Saturday night, American Country Countdown and CT30 with Bobby Bones.

History
The station began broadcasting in March 1992, as WKOT, and aired an oldies format, featuring programming from Satellite Music Network's "Pure Gold" channel. WKOT also featured local personalities, and was branded "Kool 96.5".

The station was originally owned by Barden Broadcasting. In 1998, the station was sold to Pride Communications. In 1999, the station was purchased by La Salle County Broadcasting for $550,000.

By 2006, WKOT's format had shifted to classic hits. In 2010, the station's call sign was changed to WLWF, and it began airing a country music format as "96.5 The Wolf".

On January 1, 2020, the station was purchased from La Salle County Broadcasting Corp. by Starved Rock Media, Inc.  Starved Rock Media is a company formed by LCBC employees Steve Vogler and John Spencer.

References

External links

LWF
LaSalle County, Illinois
Radio stations established in 1992
1992 establishments in Illinois
Country radio stations in the United States